
Gmina Rogów is a rural gmina (administrative district) in Brzeziny County, Łódź Voivodeship, in central Poland.

Villages
Gmina Rogów contains the villages and settlements of Jasień, Józefów, Kobylin, Kotulin, Marianów Rogowski, Mroga Dolna, Mroga Górna, Nowe Wągry, Olsza, Popień, Przyłęk Duży, Przyłęk Mały, Rogów, Rogów Wieś, Stefanów, Wągry and Zacywilki.

Neighbouring gminas
Gmina Rogów is bordered by the gminas of Brzeziny, Dmosin, Jeżów, Koluszki, Lipce Reymontowskie and Słupia. In Rogów is situated famous ferest botanical garden in Poland - ARBORETUM. Is a part of University of Live Science in Warsaw. Collections trees and schrubs 2500 species since 1922 y.  Web siete Arboretum http://arboretum.sggw.pl

References
Polish official population figures 2006

Rogow
Brzeziny County